Dharampal (19 February 1922 – 24 October 2006) was an Gandhian thinker. He authored The Beautiful Tree: Indigenous Indian Education in the Eighteenth Century (1983), Indian Science and Technology in the Eighteenth Century (1971) and Civil Disobedience and Indian Tradition (1971), among other seminal works, which have led to a radical reappraisal of conventional views of the cultural, scientific and technological achievements of Indian society at the eve of the establishment of Company rule in India.

In 2001, he was named chairman of the National Commission on Cattle and Minister of State by the Government of India.

Dharampal was instrumental in changing the understanding of pre-colonial Indian education system.

Dharampal primary works are based on documentation by the colonial government on Indian education, agriculture, technology, and arts during the period of colonial rule in India.

Works
The Beautiful Tree: Indigenous Indian Education in the Eighteenth Century (1983). Translated into Kannada by Madhava Peraje with the title Cheluva Taru
 The British Origin of Cow-slaughter in India With Some British Documents on the Anti-Kine-Killing Movement 1880-1894 (2003) By Dharampal, T. M. Mukundan.
Understanding Gandhi (2003) Essays on Gandhi.

Relevance
Dharampal's books highlighted the educational system in India before British Raj took over. In one of the reports conducted in Madras Presidency, the number of non-branhmin students were more than Brahmin students during 1820's.

Translations
The book "The Beautiful Tree" is translated into Kannada as "Cheluva Taru".

References

External links
 Dharampal
 Dharampal's India – Samanvaya
 Dharampal – Infinity Foundation
 AVARD - Association of Voluntary Agencies for Rural Development

New Imperialism
Historians of Asia
20th-century Indian historians
1922 births
2006 deaths
Indian independence activists from Uttar Pradesh
People from Muzaffarnagar
Writers from Uttar Pradesh